Sankt Barbara im Mürztal is since 2015 a market town in Styria, Austria, with 6,726 inhabitants (as of 1 January 2016) in the judicial district of Mürzzuschlag and in the political district of Bruck-Mürzzuschlag in Styria. As part of the municipality structural reform in Styria, the municipality, which was founded on 1 January 2015, was formed by the merger of the independent municipalities:
 Mitterdorf im Mürztal,
 Veitsch und
 Wartberg im Mürztal.
This was based on the Styrian municipality Structural Reform Act, StGsrG.

In this case, no major part of one of the (three) outlying communities was used as a new name, but only the district name "Mürztal" (Murtal). The new community is named after the patron saint of miners, St. Barbara. A church dedicated to St. Barbara was built in 1986 in what is now the district Mitterdorf.

Geography 
To the west is the Pretalsattel ( above sea level), which provides a connection to the Stübming valley, Turnau, and the Aflenz Basin.

In the east and southeast of the town borders the mountain range of Fischbacher Alpen.

Municipality arrangement 
The municipal area covers seven towns (in parentheses inhabitants as at 1 January 2016):

 Großveitsch (904)
 Kleinveitsch (415)
 Lutschaun (453)
 Mitterdorf im Mürztal (1,926)
 Niederaigen (643)
 Veitsch (374)
 Wartberg im Mürztal (2,012)

The community consists of the cadastrals (Katastralgemeinden): Großveitsch, Kleinveitsch, Lutschaun, Mitterdorf, Niederaigen, Scheibsgraben, Veitsch Dorf and Wartberg.

Economy and sights 
 Pilgerkreuz am Veitscher Ölberg: Starting from the Veitsch parish church, a forest trail leads to the Veitsch mount-of-olives pilgrims cross.
 Holzknecht-Ball: The Holzknecht Ball, held annually on the first Friday after January 6 (Epiphany), is organized by the Trachtenverein society D'Rauschkogler z'Veitsch. Besides the Oberlandler Ball in Graz or the Schützenball in Grundlsee, it is one of Styria's few remaining traditional costume balls with Auftanz (popular polonaise) performances. Among the traditional folk dances, the Veitscher Masur (referred to by the locals as "Veitscher Ochs gallop") is frequently practised by many visitors in the course of the evening.
 The Veitscher Grenzstaffellauf, one of Austria's toughest Alpine marathons, has been held annually since 1986 on the last Saturday in June. Top runners take just 4:30 hours for this distance. The course can also be completed by a team of three (with sections of 16.5 / 16.0 / 21.5 km). Here the winners are just under 4:00 hours. In 2013, the Austrian mountain marathon championships were held there.
 Mürztaler Landtage: The largest, multi-day agricultural fair of the Mürz valley has been held at Wartberg in the Mürztal since 2009. In addition to equipment shows and trade exhibitions in the agricultural sector, attendees are offered a wide gamut of amusement facilities and concerts of different genres.

Transportation 
The town lies on the southern railway, has 2 train stations of ÖBB ("Mitterdorf - Veitsch" or "Wartberg im Mürztal") and is accessible on the Semmering Schnellstraße S 6 (road exit "Mitterdorf"). The town can also be reached via the L 102 (Veitscherstraße) from Turnau or via the L 118 (Semmering Begleitstraße) from Kindberg and Krieglach.

Since 2016-07-18, a bus of the Mürztaler transport company is run from Kapfenberg and interconnects all 3 districts:
 Route 85 (Pretal-) Groß-Veitsch - (Dorf-Veitsch-) Niederaigen - Mitterdorf im Mürztal - Wartberg im Mürztal station.

Industry 
Mining (magnesite as from 1881), production of refractory products for smelting furnaces, steel production and processing have a long tradition and are still significant today in the area:
 RHI AG, including Veitscher Magnesitwerke - refractory materials
 Vogel & Noot AG – manufacturer of agricultural machinery and heating appliances
 Breitenfeld AG – high-grade steel works
 Bien-Zenker – prefabricated houses

Education 
 Secondary musical school "Musium" Mitterdorf
 Vocational college for forwarding merchants/logisticians

Notable people 
 Helmut Brenner (* 1957), international musicologist, historian and university lecturer
 Carl Gustav Heraeus (1671-1725), antiquarian at the imperial court in Vienna, entrepreneur, scholar and writer
 Karl Skala (1924-2006), poet
 Gunter Singer (* 1967), Austrian-American filmmaker, private military contractor, world champion kickboxer

References

External links 

 Offizieller Internetauftritt der Gemeinde

Cities and towns in Bruck-Mürzzuschlag District
Fischbach Alps